Killermachine is the third studio album by the Dutch rockband Peter Pan Speedrock.

Track listing
"Rockcity"
"Death Before Disco"
"Pedal To The Medal"
"Big Toy"
"Dukes Of Danger"
"Rollercoaster"
"Dead Mechanics"
"No Shut-Eye"
"Beerblast"
"Gonna Do Ya"
"Blow My Horny Horn"
"Wide Fuckin' Open"
"Stick It"

References

External links
official Peter Pan Speedrock website
 website of Peter Pan Speedrock local rockscene

Peter Pan Speedrock albums
2000 albums